Askham could refer to:

in England
Askham, Cumbria
Askham, Nottinghamshire
Askham Bryan, York
Askham Richard, York
in South Africa
Askham, Northern Cape

See also 
Askam and Ireleth, Cumbria, England